Barham is a village and civil parish in the Mid Suffolk district of Suffolk, England.  The village is on the River Gipping. Surrounded by Great Blakenham, Baylham, Coddenham, Henley and Claydon, Barham is on the A14 road about six miles north of Ipswich.  Barham has one pub - The Sorrel Horse -  and is also known for the Gaps Fishing lakes, situated next to the Barham Picnic site on Pesthouse Lane.

History
A local Act of 1765 established the Bosmere and Claydon Hundreds Incorporation of 35 parishes. The following year saw the Incorporation build a "House of Industry" on a 20-acre site at Barham. It was a H-shaped red brick building of two storeys with attics. Construction of the building cost £10,000. It accommodated 400 inmates and was built between Workhouse Lane (now Lower Crescent) and Pesthouse Lane (which led to an isolation hospital) standing adjacent to the site of the Barham Picnic area. The Bosmere and Claydon Union Workhouse building was demolished in 1963 ending the 198-year history. During the First World War, the workhouse premises were occupied by troops and prisoners of war. It then became a residential re-training centre for unemployed ex-servicemen, some receiving 'handyman' training and the rest being prepared for work on farms overseas. In 1929, it became one of a new type of Transfer Instructional Centres being set up by the Ministry of Labour for 'reconditioning' unemployed men who were said to have gone 'soft' by being out of work. Under the threat of losing their unemployment benefit, men were sent to the Centres and given hard physical work. The Second World War returned the site back into housing prisoners of war. Many of the men captured by the British army and sent to the Barham Workhouse were of Italian origin.

Riot in the workhouse
On 7 January 1850, a riot took place at the workhouse. Around fifty able-bodied inmates, who had been admitted a few days earlier, got out of their ward and demanded more food. After the governor told them that he had no power to alter their diet, they tore up the seats and part of the flooring in their day Rooms. With the arrival of a policeman, the men remained quiet during the night but their rioting was resumed in the next morning and the governor was struck and injured. Eventually a detachment of Lancers was sent from Ipswich but, by the time they arrived, the riot had been quelled by the police and six of the ringleaders put into prison.

Similar disturbances occurred just over a year later when there were about 490 inmates in the workhouse, 120 of whom were able-bodied men. Amongst the latter some dissatisfaction had been expressed that the quantity of food allowed them was so little. However, accepting a good deal of grumbling, things went on tolerably well until the evening of 9 February 1851. The inmates finished their supper at a little before seven, and the governor having said grace, one of the men gave a signal, and instantly about forty of them commenced a furious attack on a wooden partition that divided them from the females' ward. The governor, schoolmaster, and three police officers attempted to restore order but they were pelted with objects, one of the constables having his eye seriously damaged by a stone. The porter was struck to the ground and brutally kicked, and the superintendent of labour made, after a vain resistance, an attempt to make his escape. 
At about seven o'clock, the inmates took charge of the establishment and began demolishing the building. Glass, window-frames, benches, floors, tables, chairs, clocks, etc. were ruthlessly smashed. The provision stores were ransacked, the cooked meat was eaten, and the raw meat was quickly cooked and devoured. The wines speedily disappeared, and the stores of beer were either drunk or smashed. Emboldened by drink, the inmates wrenched the fastenings from the doors, stripped the roofs of tiles, tore up the brick stone floorings, and made a large breach in a substantial brick wall. Having provided themselves with a good stock of missiles, they showered them over the walls upon any who might happen to be near. At about nine o'clock the Rev. F. Steward, a Magistrate, rode off to Ipswich for a detachment of the military. Troops were soon mustered, and by a little past ten o’clock, they’d galloped to the scene of action. Captain Peel was in command, but he would not permit his men to dismount — it being contrary to regulations — the consequence was that the force at that time was of no use. About five policemen attended, and it was nearly twelve o'clock before another body arrived; it consisted of eight men, under Mr. Jukes. At this time, the inmates had been in complete control over the premises for five hours, and besides affecting the damage described, they had burnt the governor's account books. The whole police force was soon mustered, and by the aid of a battering ram the door was forced open. The constables drew their cutlasses (A short heavy sword with a curved single-edged blade), supported by two or three others and rushed upon the rioters. After discharging one or two sharp volleys of bricks, stones, and glass, the rioters retreated in all directions and a hot pursuit ensued for ten minutes, the scene was an exciting one. Every place was scoured, and the prisoners, when captured, were hurried out of the building and placed under the guard of the military. Many of them were intoxicated, and one strong noisy fellow after he had been turned out exclaimed, pointing to the building, "That is hell, and there they lead us to hell. God Almighty is on my side, and he'll protect me!" The prisoners were ultimately placed in the strong room. The military returned to Ipswich at three o'clock. The next morning, many of the inmates insisted their sole cause of complaint was want of sufficient food. One of them said, "Hunger is a sharp thorn, and it is enough to make us do what we would not." A total of thirty-eight of the protestors were taken into custody. Eight of the men identified by the governor as having begun the riot were committed for trial at the next Ipswich Quarter Sessions, on the charge of destroying the property of the guardians, and obstructing the police in the execution of their duty. They were immediately afterwards handcuffed and forwarded in an omnibus to Ipswich. On their passage through the streets of the town, they shouted most lustily, and seemed exceedingly merry.

Barham is one of the workhouses with a claim to have been the basis of Charles Dickens' story, Oliver Twist. Dickens is said to have been shown around the workhouse on a visit to Suffolk and to have seen a record book containing the details of a ten-year-old boy's apprenticeship.

Geography
The Barham Picnic site is an area of 2.89 hectares in the heart of the Gipping Valley and consists of a children's play area, car park, purpose-built toilets facilities and a visitors centre. The picnic area has been designated by the suffolk county council as a public right of way location to safeguard the future use of the site.

Barham village sign

The proposal that a village sign should be made and erected at some suitable spot in the parish of Barham was agreed by the Parish Council in 1985. Following this decision, a design was worked out by the late Keith Pilling, an artist and member of the council at that time. Once the design was produced, offers of help to supply materials, welding and painting were made by local residents. The sign which we see today is therefore the work done by parishioners of Barham. It was completed in 1989 and the unveiling ceremony was performed by County Councillor Mr G H Caldwell-Smith on Saturday 7 October 1989.

The sign is aluminium with a steel surrounding frame and depicts various aspects of Barham.
 The tower of the church (being by far the oldest building in the parish).
The cedar tree under which the rector of Barham, William Kirby who died on 4 July 1850 aged 90, used to sit and study moths and butterflies. He produced a book on the subject entitled 'An Introduction to Entomology'.
 A butterfly is depicted at the top right of the sign.
 A horse and ploughman indicates the rural nature of the parish
 The blue and yellow lettering reflects the earlier dedication to St Mary of the Parish Church.

The design is meant to be easily maintained with a simple black paint, only the butterfly being in colour. The whole effect depends on viewing in silhouette against the sky.
The magnificent cedar tree depicted in the village sign stood close to the footpath on the Old Norwich Road, opposite Kirby Rise for hundreds of years. In August 2002 it suffered damage from high winds but the Preservation Officer considered that with suitable pruning it would last for decades. However, in November 2002 further damage occurred during severe storms and on inspection again, the Preservation Officer considered the tree to be in a sorry state and of little amenity value. He therefore advised its removal on safety grounds and indicated that a replacement tree of the same species should be planted. The tree was finally removed and burned on site on 26 February 2003. The replacement cedar tree is now in place to grow to maturity for future generations to appreciate.

References

External links
 
 
 Gipping Angling Preservation Society

 
Villages in Suffolk
Mid Suffolk District
Civil parishes in Suffolk